Riyan Parag Das (born 10 November 2001) is an Indian cricketer who plays for Assam in domestic cricket and Rajasthan Royals in the Indian Premier League (IPL).

Personal life
Riyan's father, Parag Das is a former first-class cricketer who played for Assam and Railways. His mother Mithoo Barooah,  is a former national record holding swimmer in 50m freestyle who represented India at the Asian Championships and SAF Games.

Career
Riyan made his Twenty20 debut for Assam in the 2016–17 Inter State Twenty-20 Tournament on 29 January 2017. In October 2017, he was named in India's squad for the 2017 ACC Under-19 Asia Cup. He made his first-class debut for Assam in the 2017–18 Ranji Trophy on 17 November 2017.

In December 2017, he was named in India's squad for the 2018 Under-19 Cricket World Cup. He was the leading run-scorer for Assam in the 2018–19 Vijay Hazare Trophy, with 248 runs in seven matches.

In December 2018, he was bought by the Rajasthan Royals in the player auction for the 2019 Indian Premier League at his base price of 20 lakhs. During the 2019 Indian Premier League, he became the youngest cricketer to score a fifty in the history of the Indian Premier League. He achieved the feat at the age of 17 years and 175 days  breaking the previous record of 18 years and 169 days, jointly held by Sanju Samson and Prithvi Shaw. 

He was released by Rajasthan ahead of the mega auction for 2022 Indian Premier League. In February 2022, he was re-bought by the Rajasthan Royals in the auction for the 2022 Indian Premier League tournament.

Honours

 Indian Premier League runner up 2022

References

External links
 

2001 births
Living people
Indian cricketers
Assam cricketers
Cricketers from Guwahati
Rajasthan Royals cricketers